Charles Sweetser (January 22, 1808 – April 14, 1864) was a U.S. Representative from Ohio.

Born in Dummerston, Vermont, Sweetser moved with his parents to Delaware, Ohio, in 1817.
He attended the public schools.
He engaged in mercantile pursuits.
He studied law.
He was admitted to the bar in 1832 and commenced practice in Delaware, Ohio.

Sweetser was elected as a Democrat to the Thirty-first and Thirty-second Congresses (March 4, 1849 – March 3, 1853).
He served as chairman of the Committee on Public Expenditures (Thirty-second Congress).
He resumed the practice of law.
He died in Delaware, Ohio, April 14, 1864.
He was interred in Oak Grove Cemetery.

Sources

External links

 

1808 births
1864 deaths
People from Dummerston, Vermont
People from Delaware, Ohio
Ohio lawyers
Burials at Oak Grove Cemetery, Delaware, Ohio
19th-century American politicians
19th-century American lawyers
Democratic Party members of the United States House of Representatives from Ohio